Bernardo Matte Larraín (born 1954/1955) is a Chilean billionaire businessman, and a major shareholder in the Chilean forestry and paper company CMPC, founded by his father.

Matter earned a bachelor's degree from the University of Chile.

He is chairman of Colbún S.A., Chile’s third-largest energy producer.

As of March 2019, Forbes estimated his net worth at US$1.0 billion.

He has three children: Bernardo Matte Izquierdo, Sofía Matte Izquierdo, and Francisco Matte Izquierdo.

References

1955 births
Living people
Chilean businesspeople
Chilean billionaires
Bernardo
University of Chile alumni
Chilean manufacturing businesspeople